Zvonimir Soldo (born 2 November 1967) is a Croatian football manager and a former player. During his playing career, he mostly played as defensive midfielder.

Club career

Early career
After studying law for six semesters at the University of Zagreb, Soldo's parents convinced him to pursue a career as professional football player.

Soldo's professional career began with NK Dinamo Zagreb which he left for NK Zadar after two years. 1991 through 1994, he played for NK Inter Zaprešić before returning to his former club, now named NK Croatia Zagreb.

Runner-up in both Croatian league and cup in his first season back at Zagreb, the next campaign saw Soldo's side complete a domestic double in 1995/96. After achieving all he could in domestic football, Soldo headed for German side VfB Stuttgart.

VfB Stuttgart

Soldo made his Bundesliga debut on 17 August 1996 against FC Schalke 04. This was
the beginning of his time in Stuttgart which would last for ten years and during which
he would lead VfB Stuttgart on the pitch as captain nearly 200 times.

During this period, Soldo played another 300 times in the Bundesliga and 47 times in European competitions, won the German cup in 1997 and reached the European Cup Winners' Cup final in 1998, as well as finishing as runner-up in the 2002–03 campaign.

After being an exemplary sportsman and role model for younger players all these years, Soldo played his last Bundesliga match for Stuttgart on 6 May 2006.

In recognition of his merits, Soldo received the Staufer medal, a decoration awarded by the state of Baden-Württemberg.

International career
Soldo was also a long-time member of the national team and made his debut for Croatia in an April 1994 friendly match away against Slovakia, coming on as a 46th-minute substitute for Slavko Ištvanić. He earned a total of 61 caps, scoring 3 goals and was an important member of the squad that finished third in the 1998 World Cup and also made notable appearances at the Euro 96 and 2002 FIFA World Cups. His final international was a June 2002 FIFA World Cup match against Italy and Soldo retired from international football after that tournament.

Coaching career

Dinamo Zagreb
On 14 January 2008 Zvonimir was appointed as a new manager of Dinamo Zagreb after Branko Ivanković's resignation. Prior to that he was managing Dinamo's youth team. He became Prva HNL Champion and Croatian Cup Winner. He offered his resignation in the night after the cup final to make space to old/new manager Branko Ivanković.

1. FC Köln
From June 2009 to October 2010, Soldo was the manager of German Bundesliga club, 1. FC Köln (Cologne) after the club's former coach Christoph Daum surprisingly left to sign for Fenerbahçe.

Admira Wacker
On 13 September 2020, he resigned as manager of Admira Wacker, following a 1–4 loss to Rapid Wien.

Tractor S.C.
On 14 November 2021, he was appointed as coach of Tractor.

Career statistics
Scores and results list Croatia's goal tally first, score column indicates score after each Soldo goal.

Honours

Player
Inker Zaprešić
 Croatian Cup: 1992

Dinamo Zagreb
 Croatian First League: 1995–96
 Croatian Cup: 1995–96

VfB Stuttgart
 DFB-Pokal: 1996–97
 UEFA Cup Winners' Cup Runner-up: 1997–98
 UEFA Intertoto Cup: 2000
 Bundesliga Runner-up: 2002–03

Croatia
 FIFA World Cup third place: 1998

Manager
Dinamo Zagreb
Croatian First League: 2007–08
Croatian Cup: 2007–08

Orders
 Order of Danica Hrvatska with face of Franjo Bučar – 1995
 Order of the Croatian Trefoil – 1998

References

External links
 

1967 births
Living people
Footballers from Zagreb
Association football midfielders
Association football central defenders
Yugoslav footballers
Croatian footballers
Croatia international footballers
UEFA Euro 1996 players
1998 FIFA World Cup players
2002 FIFA World Cup players
GNK Dinamo Zagreb players
NK Zadar players
NK Inter Zaprešić players
VfB Stuttgart players
Yugoslav First League players
Croatian Football League players
Bundesliga players
Croatian expatriate footballers
Expatriate footballers in Germany
Croatian expatriate sportspeople in Germany
Croatian football managers
GNK Dinamo Zagreb managers
1. FC Köln managers
FC Admira Wacker Mödling managers
Tractor S.C. managers
Croatian Football League managers
Bundesliga managers
Austrian Football Bundesliga managers
Persian Gulf Pro League managers
Croatian expatriate football managers
Expatriate football managers in Germany
Expatriate football managers in Austria
Croatian expatriate sportspeople in Austria
Expatriate football managers in Iran
Croatian expatriate sportspeople in Iran